Hans-Jürgen Steinmann (4 September 1929 in Żagań, Province of Lower Silesia – 22 September 2008 in Halle (Saale)) was a German writer. In 1979 he was awarded the Handel Prize.

Works 
 Brücke ins Leben, Berlin 1953
 Die Fremde, Halle (Saale) 1959
 Die größere Liebe, Berlin 1959
 Stimmen der Jahre, Berlin 1963
 Über die Grenze, Berlin 1963
 Von all unseren Kameraden ..., Halle 1967 (together with Roswitha Berndt and Ewald Buchsbaum)
 Analyse H., Berlin 1968
 Träume und Tage, Halle (Saale) 1970
 Zwei Schritte vor dem Glück, Halle 1978
 Halle, Halle-Neustadt, Leipzig 1979 (together with Gerald Große)
 Merseburg, Leipzig 1980 (together with Gerald Große)
 Eisleben, Leipzig 1983 (together with Eberhard Klöppel)
 Quedlinburg, Leipzig 1988 (together with Karl-Heinz Böhle)
 Erlebtes – Erfahrenes – Ungedrucktes, Halle 1998

References

External links 
 
 Bibliography on ZVAB

1929 births
2008 deaths
Sagan
20th-century German writers
East German literature
Recipients of the Patriotic Order of Merit in bronze
Handel Prize winners